Sir Peter James Luff (born 18 February 1955) is Chair of the National Heritage Memorial Fund and the National Lottery Heritage Fund. Formerly a British Conservative Party politician, he was the Member of Parliament (MP) for Mid Worcestershire from 1997 to 2015 and for Worcester from 1992 until 1997. He was a junior Defence Minister from 2010 to 2012.

Early life
Peter Luff was born in the Berkshire town of Windsor and attended the local Windsor Grammar School. He studied at Corpus Christi College, Cambridge, receiving a Bachelor of Arts (BA) degree in Economics in 1976; as per tradition, his BA was promoted to a Master of Arts (MA Cantab) degree.

Before entering parliament, he worked for three years from 1977 as a research assistant to the Conservative MP Peter Walker, before managing Edward Heath's private office for two years from 1980. He became the managing director of Good Relations Ltd, a public affairs company, in 1982.

In 1987, he became a special adviser to the Secretary of State for Trade and Industry, David Young. He became a senior consultant for Lowe Bell Communications (later Bell Pottinger Communications) in 1989, before again working for Good Relations from 1990.

Parliamentary career
He contested Holborn and St Pancras at the general election of 1987, but was comfortably beaten by the sitting Labour MP, Frank Dobson. He was first elected to Parliament for Worcester, when he succeeded his former boss, Peter Walker.

Following changes in the parliamentary constituency boundaries, he was selected for the new Mid Worcestershire constituency, comprising large areas of three former constituencies, defeating another sitting Conservative MP, Eric Forth, for the nomination. He won the safe seat comfortably and was a member of the House of Commons from 1992. In the 1997 Labour landslide, he held his seat, and retained it until standing down in 2015.

He was appointed a Parliamentary Private Secretary (PPS) in 1993 to the energy minister Tim Eggar, and from 1996 he served as PPS to both Ann Widdecombe the prisons minister at the Home Office and Lord Mackay, Lord Chancellor. He held these two positions simultaneously until the defeat of the Conservative government at the general election of 1997.

He served on many parliamentary select committees, including chairing the Agriculture committee from 1997 to 2000, and from 2005 to 2010 he chaired what was successively known as the Trade and Industry Committee; the Business and Enterprise Select Committee; and the Business, Innovation and Skills Select Committee.

He was the founder member of the Parliamentary Hunting with Hounds Middle Way Group, and took a keen parliamentary interest in India. In the Conservative-Liberal Democrat Coalition of May 2010, Luff was appointed as a junior Defence minister at the Ministry of Defence, with the post of Minister for Defence Equipment, Support and Technology.

Prior to the general election of 2015, Luff had stood down as a candidate. He was knighted in the 2014 New Year Honours for political and public service. He joined the National Heritage Memorial Fund and the National Lottery Heritage Fund as Chair of the Board of Trustees on 30 March 2015.

Personal life
He married Julia Jenks in 1982. They have a son and a daughter.

References

External links 
 Peter Luff MP official constituency website

1955 births
Alumni of Corpus Christi College, Cambridge
Living people
Conservative Party (UK) MPs for English constituencies
UK MPs 1992–1997
UK MPs 1997–2001
UK MPs 2001–2005
UK MPs 2005–2010
UK MPs 2010–2015
Knights Bachelor
People from Windsor, Berkshire
Members of the Parliament of the United Kingdom for Worcester
Politicians awarded knighthoods